Thirunellai (translit=Tirunellāyi)  is a residential area in Palakkad city, Kerala, India. It is located on the banks of the Kannadi River and is about four kilometers from the district headquarters. Thirunellayi is famous for Agraharam.Thirunellayi is wards 35 and 36 of Palakkad Municipality.

Gallery

References

 
Suburbs of Palakkad
Cities and towns in Palakkad district